Cheese is a dairy product usually made from the milk of cows, buffalo, goats or sheep.

Cheese may also refer to:

Culinary terms
 Tofu cheese, or fermented bean curd
 Head cheese, a cold cut terrine or meat jelly 
 Quince cheese, a jelly made of the pulp of the quince fruit

Arts, entertainment and media

Fictional characters
 Cheese (Foster's Home for Imaginary Friends)
 Big Cheese, the prime minister of Little Tokyo in the anime Samurai Pizza Cats
 Cheese the Chao, a character in the Sonic the Hedgehog franchise
 Cheese Wagstaff, a character on the TV series The Wire
 The Cheese, a character in the webcomic It's Walky!
 Chuck E. Cheese (character), mascot of the Chuck E. Cheese chain of restaurants

Other uses in arts, entertainment and media
 Cheese (album), a 2010 album by Stromae
 Cheese, or Fleet Street, a 2004 album by the Stanford Fleet Street Singers
 Cheese!, a monthly Japanese manga magazine
 Cheese, an object used in the sport of Skittles
 The Cheese, a New Zealand LPFM radio station
 Cheese (speedrunner), a Super Mario 64 speedrunner
 Cheese, a novel by Willem Elsschot

People with the surname
 Bernard Cheese (1925–2013), British painter and printmaker, father of Chloe
 Chloe Cheese (born 1952), English artist, daughter of Bernard
 Richard Cheese (born 1965), American musician and comedian

Other uses
 Cheese (recreational drug)
 Cheese (software), a webcam application
 Cheese head (screw), a description of the shape of the head of some screws
 "Say cheese", an expression used in English-speaking countries when photographing people
 Cheese/Cheesy, used in the context of kitsch; see Camp (style)
 Chuck E. Cheese, an American family entertainment center and restaurant chain

See also
 Cheez (disambiguation)
 Cheesy (disambiguation)
 Cheese It (disambiguation)
 Big Cheese (disambiguation)